The systole (or systolic category) is a numerical invariant of a closed manifold M, introduced by Mikhail Katz and Yuli Rudyak in 2006, by analogy with the Lusternik–Schnirelmann category. The invariant is defined in terms of the systoles of M and its covers, as the largest number of systoles in a product yielding a curvature-free lower bound for the total volume of M. The invariant is intimately related to the Lusternik-Schnirelmann category. Thus, in dimensions 2 and 3, the two invariants coincide. In dimension 4, the systolic category is known to be a lower bound for the Lusternik–Schnirelmann category.

Bibliography

 Dranishnikov, A.; Rudyak, Y. (2009) Stable systolic category of manifolds and the cup-length. Journal of Fixed Point Theory and Applications 6, no. 1, 165–177.
 Katz, M.; Rudyak, Y. (2008) Bounding volume by systoles of 3-manifolds. Journal of the London Mathematical Society 78, no 2, 407–417.
 Dranishnikov, A.; Katz, M.; Rudyak, Y. (2011) Cohomological dimension, self-linking, and systolic geometry. Israel Journal of Mathematics 184, no 1, 437–453. See .
 Brunnbauer, M. (2008) On manifolds satisfying stable systolic inequalities. Mathematische Annalen 342, no. 4, 951–968.
 Katz, M.; Rudyak, Y. (2006) Lusternik–Schnirelmann category and systolic category of low dimensional manifolds. Communications on Pure and Applied Mathematics 59, no. 10, 1433–1456.

Systolic geometry